Claude Jasmin (10 November 1930 – 28 April 2021) was a Canadian journalist, broadcaster, and writer.

While very prolific, with almost 50 published titles to his credit, he is most famous for his 1972 novel La Petite Patrie, an autobiographical novel about growing up in a working-class neighbourhood of Montreal in the 1940s. The novel served as the basis for a very popular television series on Radio-Canada which ran for two seasons from 1974 to 1976, and was adapted in graphic novel form in 2015. It is now considered a classic of Québécois literature, and the neighbourhood in which it is set has since been renamed "Rosemont-La Petite Patrie" in Jasmin's honour. He served as the screenwriter for the television adaptation of his novel, and later was the screenwriter for a number of other television series, many of which were based on his novels.

His start as a writer came as one of the pioneers of the crime novel genre in Quebec: his first novel, La corde au cou ("A rope around his neck", 1960) is about a remorseless killer, and he returned regularly to the genre over the years, including a series of novels featuring detective Charles Asselin in the 1980s. Several theatrical films were adapted from his novels, including Rope Around the Neck (La corde au cou) and Deliver Us from Evil (Délivrez-nous du mal).

Honors 
 1960 – Prix du Cercle du livre de France
 1965 – Prix Jean-Hamelin, Éthel et le terroriste
 1970 – Prix Québec-Paris, La Sablière
 1980 – Prix Ludger-Duvernay
 1980 – Prix France-Canada, La Sablière
 2016 – Prix Athanase-David (Prix du Québec)

References

External links
 

1930 births
2021 deaths
French Quebecers
Prix Athanase-David winners
Canadian male novelists
Canadian novelists in French
Canadian male short story writers
Canadian short story writers in French
Canadian male screenwriters
Canadian screenwriters in French
Canadian television hosts
Canadian radio hosts
20th-century Canadian journalists
20th-century Canadian novelists
20th-century Canadian screenwriters
20th-century Canadian short story writers
20th-century Canadian male writers